Michael Serth (born on 24 June 1975), is a German former trampoline gymnast. He had competed at the 2000 Summer Olympics in Sydney.

References

1975 births
Living people
German male trampolinists
Olympic gymnasts of Germany
Gymnasts at the 2000 Summer Olympics